Shawn Thornton (born July 23, 1977) is a Canadian former professional ice hockey player of the National Hockey League (NHL). An enforcer throughout his career, he won two Stanley Cups with the Anaheim Ducks (2007) and the Boston Bruins (2011).

Playing career

Thornton played minor hockey for his hometown Oshawa Minor Generals of the OMHA's Eastern AAA League. He was drafted in the 9th round (145th overall) by the Peterborough Petes in the 1995 OHL Priority Selection.

Thornton attempted to be drafted in the 1996 NHL draft but was not selected by any team. He was then drafted into the NHL by the Toronto Maple Leafs in 1997, 190th overall, Thornton never played for Toronto and was traded to the Chicago Blackhawks during the 2001–02 season. After six seasons back and forth between the NHL and AHL between the Chicago and Anaheim Ducks franchises, Thornton won his first career Stanley Cup in his final season with the Ducks in 2006–07.

On July 1, 2007, Thornton signed a three-year, 1.5 million dollar, deal with the Boston Bruins.  During a seven-year tenure in Boston, Thornton won his second career Stanley Cup during the 2010–11 season in which he also tallied career high numbers in goals (10), assists (10), points (20) and +/– (8).

At the end of the 2013–14 season, the Bruins organization informed Thornton that they would not be re-signing him, ending his career in Boston. That summer, he signed a two-year contract with the Florida Panthers.  At the end of his contract, he re-signed with Florida for one year.

On April 6, 2017, Thornton announced that he would be retiring at the end of the season and played his final game on April 8. During the announcement of his retirement, he revealed that he would be joining the Panthers' front office in a business related position after the conclusion of his playing career.

Brooks Orpik incident
On December 7, 2013, Thornton tried to goad Pittsburgh Penguins defenseman Brooks Orpik into fighting after Orpik delivered a borderline hit on Boston’s Loui Eriksson early in the first period. Orpik rebuffed Thornton’s invitation and at 11:06 of the first period, after a whistle due to Penguins winger James Neal kneeing Bruins winger Brad Marchand in the head, Thornton approached a thicket of players from both teams, slew-footed Orpik from behind and, while Orpik was on the ice, punched him at least twice. Six days later, he received his suspension after an in-person hearing with the league’s department of player safety. He appealed the suspension and had a hearing that Friday with NHL commissioner Gary Bettman, who did not immediately announce a decision. On December 14, 2013, Thornton was suspended for fifteen games. Thornton, who was emotional after the game, contacted Orpik directly to apologize. Orpik conveyed forgiveness and understanding. Thornton and Orpik, who are friends, were part of a group of players who had worked out together in the offseason and during the NHL lockout.

Personal life
Thornton founded the Thornton Foundation in 2013, which among other things, funds research into finding cures for Parkinson's disease and cancer.

Thornton is a cousin of professional lacrosse players Zack and Bill Greer. Zack plays for the San Diego Seals of the National Lacrosse League (NLL), while Bill has retired and works for the Seals as an assistant coach. Thornton is also the cousin of footballer Chris Brunt, who represented the Northern Ireland national team  and most recently played for Bristol City F.C. of the EFL Championship.

Thornton was a part-owner of a restaurant in Pembroke, Massachusetts named Turner's Yard, which closed in 2014. Former Boston Red Sox pitcher Tim Wakefield was also a member of the owner's group.

Thornton made a cameo in the 2012 film Ted as an audience member at a Norah Jones concert. Thornton also featured on season 5 of Kitchen Nightmares in 2011.

Career statistics

Awards and honours

References

External links
 

1977 births
Living people
Anaheim Ducks players
Boston Bruins players
Canadian ice hockey right wingers
Canadian people of Northern Ireland descent
Chicago Blackhawks players
Florida Panthers executives
Florida Panthers players
Ice hockey people from Ontario
Norfolk Admirals players
Peterborough Petes (ice hockey) players
Portland Pirates players
St. John's Maple Leafs players
Sportspeople from Oshawa
Stanley Cup champions
Toronto Maple Leafs draft picks